The 2016 Karaliaus Mindaugo taurė, also known as KIDY Tour – Karaliaus Mindaugo taurė for sponsorship purposes, was the first edition of the newly formed Lithuanian King Mindaugas Cup. It's managed by the Lithuanian Basketball League and the Lithuanian Basketball Federation. The competition was held in Vilnius, in the Siemens Arena on February 19–21, 2016.

Lietuvos rytas won the inaugural tournament, defeating Žalgiris 67–57 in the final. Their captain Antanas Kavaliauskas was awarded as MVP of the tournament. Neptūnas took the third place after a victory against Vytautas.

Performers
The event included Leon Somov & Jazzu, Vaidas Baumila, Dee & Kammy and Jamma & W musical performances.

Qualified teams
Eight best ranked 2015–16 LKL season teams qualified into the tournament.

Bracket

Quarterfinals

Vytautas Prienai-Birštonas vs. Juventus Utena

Žalgiris Kaunas vs. Nevėžis Kėdainiai

Neptūnas Klaipėda vs. Šiauliai

Lietuvos rytas Vilnius vs. Lietkabelis Panevėžys

Semifinals

Žalgiris Kaunas vs. Vytautas Prienai-Birštonas

Lietuvos rytas Vilnius vs. Neptūnas Klaipėda

Bronze final

Final

References

External links
Karaliaus Mindaugo taurė news

2016
2015–16 in Lithuanian basketball
2015–16 LKL season
Sports competitions in Vilnius
February 2016 sports events in Europe
21st century in Vilnius